Andrés Marín (February 4, 1843 - July 27, 1896) was a Spanish tenor.  He belonged to the choir of the Teatro Real, which debuted in 1866.

Spanish tenors
People from Teruel
1843 births
1896 deaths
19th-century Spanish male opera singers